18 Partsezd is a rural locality (a village) in Andreyevskoye Rural Settlement of Omsky District, Russia. The population was 234 as of 2010.

Geography 
18 Partsezd is located 40 km north of Rostovka (the district's administrative centre) by road. Khvoyny is the nearest rural locality.

Streets 
 Molodezhnaya
 Proizvodstvennaya
 Tsentralnaya

References 

Rural localities in Omsk Oblast